Reverse migration may refer to:
Reverse migration (birds), a phenomenon in bird migration
Reverse migration (immunology), the phenomena during inflammation resolution
Return migration (disambiguation)